Montgomery Morrison Cothren (September 18, 1819October 27, 1888) was an American lawyer, Democratic politician, and Wisconsin pioneer.  He served 18 years as a Wisconsin circuit court judge, and was a member of the Wisconsin State Senate.

Biography

Montgomery Cothren was born in Jerusalem, New York, in 1819, and, as a child, moved west to the Michigan Territory with his parents.  He worked on his father's farm near Kalamazoo until age 19.  He had some common school education in New York, but had little formal education in the Michigan Territory.  Nevertheless, he studied the legal profession in his free time.  At age 19, he went to the lead mining region of the Wisconsin Territory and taught school.  He continued to study the law in his free time, and was admitted to the bar in 1843.  Shortly after, he was also chosen as Clerk of the County Board of Iowa County, and moved to Mineral Point, where he would reside for the rest of his life.

That same year, he became a junior partner to attorney Parley Eaton in a firm known as Eaton & Cothren, and began to distinguish himself in the legal profession.  By 1847, he had won the approval of his community and was elected to the Territorial Legislature for the 1847 special session, and subsequently to the 1848 session.  After the establishment of the Wisconsin state government, in the fall of 1848 he won election to the Wisconsin State Senate, serving in the 1849 and 1850 sessions.  He was chairman of the Senate Judiciary Committee in 1849 and led a commission of lawyers in compiling the revised statutes of 1849—the first compilation of the state's laws.

He became a prominent member of the Democratic Party in Wisconsin and, in the fall of 1852, he was nominated by the party for Wisconsin circuit court judge in the 5th circuit, and was also chosen as a state at-large presidential elector for Franklin Pierce.  Cothren won both elections, defeating incumbent Judge Mortimer M. Jackson, and representing Wisconsin in the election of Franklin Pierce.  Cothren was re-elected to another six-year term in 1858, and in 1863, he was the Democratic nominee for Chief Justice of the Wisconsin Supreme Court, but was defeated by the incumbent, Luther S. Dixon.

He did not stand for re-election in 1864 and left office that spring to resume his law practice.  He returned to politics in 1876 and was elected to a final six-year term as circuit court judge.  Over these six years, he would stand for office three more times and lost all three elections.  In 1879, he was defeated in the election for Wisconsin Supreme Court; in 1880, he lost election to the United States House of Representatives in the 3rd congressional district; in 1882, he lost his bid for re-election in his circuit court seat.

Cothren died at his home in Calamine, Wisconsin, from bilious fever in 1888.

References

1819 births
1888 deaths
People from Jerusalem, New York
People from Mineral Point, Wisconsin
People from Willow Springs, Wisconsin
Wisconsin state court judges
Members of the Wisconsin Territorial Legislature
19th-century American politicians
Democratic Party Wisconsin state senators
1856 United States presidential electors
19th-century American judges